Causecast was a pro-social software company, founded in 2007 and based in Los Angeles. The company provided an online platform that helped businesses and organizations manage community giving, employee volunteering, donations, matching, rewarding, and cause campaigns ranging from disaster relief to competitive corporate crowdfunding. Causecast partnered with a broad range of businesses, including America's Charities in 2015.

History 
Causecast was formed by Ryan Scott, who  as the co-founder of NetCreations  is widely considered the father of opt-in email marketing.  Ryan founded Causecast in 2007 to bring sophisticated technology to volunteer and giving programs.  Ryan's commitment to community engagement around social change also led him to form the Impact and Education sections of the Huffington Post with Arianna Huffington.

In August 2019, it was announced that America's Charities acquired Causecast.  America's Charities currently manages the giving and engagement platform.

Services 
The Causecast SaaS technology, now billed as America's Charities All-in-One Giving solution, offers tools to make workplace giving and volunteering more efficient and which allows corporations to track volunteering and giving efforts in real-time. The platform employs features such as gamification, a mobile application, corporate competitive crowdfunding to increase employee engagement and community impact, social media capabilities so employees can easily enlist their personal networks in their cause activities, and more. Causecast for Nonprofits is a community impact platform and dashboard for charities to provide their missions, logos, and giving and volunteering needs and opportunities. The charity information feeds to a database accessed by corporate users and nonprofits.

External links
 Official website

References

Business services companies established in 2007
2007 establishments in California
Defunct companies based in Greater Los Angeles
Business services companies disestablished in 2019
2019 disestablishments in California
2019 mergers and acquisitions